The Wild Ammonoosuc River is a tributary of the Ammonoosuc River, about  long, in northwestern New Hampshire in the United States. Via the Ammonoosuc River, it is part of the watershed of the Connecticut River, which flows to Long Island Sound.

The Wild Ammonoosuc flows for its entire length in Grafton County. It rises in the White Mountains at Kinsman Notch in the town of Woodstock and flows generally northwestwardly through the towns of Easton and Landaff to Bath, where it joins the Ammonoosuc. New Hampshire Route 112 follows the river for its entire length.

See also

List of New Hampshire rivers

References

Rivers of New Hampshire
Rivers of Grafton County, New Hampshire
Tributaries of the Connecticut River
Ammonoosuc, Wild